Laura Bay Conservation Park is a protected area located in the Australian state of South Australia on the west coast of Eyre Peninsula adjoining the headland of Laura Bay Point in the gazetted locality of Laura Bay about  south east of the town of Ceduna.  

It was proclaimed on 15 February 1973. The Laura Bay Conservation Reserve which have been dedicated as a conservation reserve under the state’s Crown Lands Act 1929  on 11 November 1993 was added to the conservation park on 10 July 2014.

 The following state of significance was published in 1980:This small park (sic) preserves a diversity of coastal communities ranging from coastal mallee scrub through to mangrove flats. Mangrove areas in South Australia have been markedly depleted.  Laura Bay Conservation Park is scenically attractive and accommodates many tourists and visitors.

The conservation park is classified as an IUCN Category III protected area.

See also
Protected areas of South Australia
Laura (disambiguation)

References

External links
Laura Bay Conservation Park official webpage
Parks of the Far West official brochure
Laura Bay Conservation Park webpage on protected planet

Conservation parks of South Australia
Protected areas established in 1973
1973 establishments in Australia
Eyre Peninsula